14:59 is the third studio album by American rock band Sugar Ray, released on January 12, 1999.  It entered the top 20 on the Billboard 200, peaking at number 17 and certified quadruple-platinum by the RIAA. The album shows the band moving into a more mainstream pop rock sound, due to the success of their single "Fly" off their prior album, Floored. The album's title is a self-deprecating reference to the "15 minutes of fame" critics claimed the band was riding on.

Background
In 1997, Sugar Ray released their second album, Floored. Late in the recording sessions, the band recorded a much poppier track, the reggae song "Fly". The track became a surprise hit. The track's massive success inspired the band to further pursue the sound on their following album, 14:59.  McGrath admitted "Fly" was "the blueprint now for experimentation".<ref>Q&A: Mark McGrath of Sugar Ray, Rolling Stone</ref>

Music and lyrics
The album's sound has elements of alternative rock and pop rock. "Aim for Me" is a punk rock track in the vein of Green Day and "Falls Apart" and "Personal Space Invader" take influence from The Police's Synchronicity and Men Without Hats, while "Burning Dog" has a skate punk sound similar to The Offspring and "Live & Direct" features vocals from KRS-One. In addition, "Every Morning" (that has been called an acoustic pop number), "Someday" and "Ode to the Lonely Hearted" are reminiscent of previous hit single "Fly". The album also features two comedic songs titled "New Direction", the former being death metal and the latter a circus music instrumental.

Despite displaying a more accessible sound than previous albums, guitarist Rodney Sheppard noted that the band still had the same lighthearted approach to music as before, saying: "we're not begging to be taken seriously. We'd feel stupid. We've been doing interviews for years saying we don't take ourselves seriously. It would be lame for us to say, 'Now we are'. We're still pranksters, just the lyrical content is more serious."

Promotion and release
The song "Glory" was used in the film American Pie, and featured on the soundtrack album.

Reception

The album was generally well received by critics. Paul Pearson of AllMusic wrote, "Their third album showed an alarming overhaul in their approach...from their metal shellac toward a calmer, melodious pastiche of songs. and concluded that 14:59 has such catchiness and charm that it's a guilty pleasure of high order, and a bigger step than one might have expected from Sugar Ray." NME's referred to the album as a "hellishly difficult record to hate...Not that this is especially inspired stuff, but, if you wanted a soundtrack for the kind of sun-kissed pool-party the sleeve depicts, 14:59 is maybe as good as you could get today." Rolling Stone praised the album for its diversity and for not sticking too closely to the sound of "Fly" stating that the band instead "...go[es] off the deep end with gorgeous psychedelic guitar hooks and drum loops, and Mark McGrath's wise-guy futon talk... everything they play is shaped by the cut-and-paste aesthetic of the sampler." Robert Christgau picked out the album's song, "Every Morning", as a choice cut.

David Browne of Entertainment Weekly was less positive and stated: "It's genuinely hard to hate Sugar Ray; [...] Still, listening to '14:59' is a somewhat sad, depressing experience. [...] The album is the sound of a band resigned to the possibility that they may be one-hit wunderkinds and that the 2 million fans who bought their last album may have moved on to Barenaked Ladies."

 Track listing 

Sugar Ray sold a different version of the 14:59 album to audiences that attended their live tour.  This album included 5 tracks not found on the retail version. These tracks are:

 The hit "Fly" from their previous Floored album
 The original demo recording of "Aim for Me"
 A live acoustic version of "Every Morning"
 The radio edit of "Falls Apart"
 "Rivers", a song written in the style of and in tribute to Weezer frontman Rivers Cuomo

Personnel
 Mark McGrath – lead vocals, rhythm guitar 
 Rodney Sheppard – lead guitar, backing vocals
 Murphy Karges – bass, guitar, backing vocals 
 Stan Frazier – drums, percussion, guitar, programming, backing vocals, co-lead vocals on Someday'' 
 Craig "DJ Homicide" Bullock – turntables, samples, programming, keyboards, backing vocals

Charts

Weekly charts

Year-end charts

Certifications

References

Sugar Ray albums
1999 albums
Atlantic Records albums
Albums produced by David Kahne
Albums produced by Ralph Sall